Viktor Ivanovich Ryzhkin (born 26 April 1937 in Moscow) is a former ice dancer who competed for the Soviet Union. With Lyudmila Pakhomova, whom he had initially coached, he won three Soviet national titles and placed 10th at the 1966 World Championships. Their partnership ended in 1966. With his next partner Irina Grishkova, Ryzhkin finished 4th at the 1968 European Championships and 5th at the 1968 World Championships. They won gold medals at the 1967 Prague Skate and twice at the Prize of Moscow News.

After retiring from competition, Ryzhkin worked as a skating coach at CSKA Moscow.

Results

With Pakhomova

With Grishkova

References

Russian male ice dancers
Soviet male ice dancers
Figure skaters from Moscow
1937 births
Living people